Lorenzo Nottolini (May 6, 1787 – September 12, 1851) was an architect and engineer of the Neoclassic style in Lucca, Italy.

Biography
He was born at Capannori, but lived and mainly worked in Lucca. He is famous for the Nottolini aqueduct and the urban refurbishment of the site known as the Piazza Anfiteatro.

All of his siblings were educated in the same seminary, where three out of five brothers became priests and his sister became a nun.

In 1807, one of his teachers, Giovanni Lazzarini, worked for the Duchess of Lucca, Elisa Baciocchi, sister of Napoleon Bonaparte. Lazzarini asked the young Nottolini to become his assistant in his redesign of Villa Reale in Marlia. By 1810, Nottolini had graduated from studies and was a surveyor. He was recruited at once in the public administration and became assistant of the head engineer. A year later, he obtained a 1500 franc scholarship from Duke Felice Baciocchi, husband of Elisa, and travelled to Bologna and then Florence. He enrolled at the Academy of Fine Arts, Florence, where he met Canova. By 1818, he moved to Rome, where he met Giuseppe Valadier and attended the Academy of Saint Luke, Rome.

In Rome, he met Maria Luisa of Bourbon, who became the Duchess of Lucca after the fall of Napoleon. Once rising to power, Maria Luisa appointed him Royal Architect for the Kingdom of Etruria, and two years later, engineer of the Counsel of Water, Roads and Woods.

Main works

The Aqueduct of Nottolini (constructed 1823–1851) is one of his best known works, since it is visible from the A11 autostrada that connects Florence and Pisa.

Nottolini was involved in part of what is described as the Great Project of Tuscany, wherein a number of marshes and swamps were drained to create arable land. In Lucca, the Lake of Bientina or Lake of Sesto were partially drained. The project also involved the architects and engineers from Florence: Leonardo Ximenes, Vittorio Fossombroni and Antonio Manetti.

Nottolini was involved in the urban renewal of Lucca. For example, the defensive moats were filled in during 1818–1820. The Teatro del Giglio was refurbished (1819). He designed (1819) the Specola of Lucca in the hamlet of San Pancrazio above the town of Lucca. He cleared out the Piazza known as Anfiteatro Square in Lucca (1830–1839). He also designed the Hunting Lodge of Duke Charles II of Parma.

Nottolini traveled to Germany and England to study new techniques of bridge construction. He used this knowledge to design the Ponte delle Catene in Fornoli in the region known as the Bagni di Lucca. Construction of the bridge continued after Nottolini's death in 1851 in Lucca, and lasted until 1860.

References

1787 births
1851 deaths
18th-century Italian architects
19th-century Italian architects
Accademia di Belle Arti di Firenze alumni
Architects from Parma
Italian neoclassical architects